John Henry "Doc" Stafford (April 8, 1870 – July 3, 1940) was a pitcher in Major League Baseball in 1893.

Stafford attended College of the Holy Cross in Worcester, Massachusetts, and later pitched in two games for the Cleveland Spiders in 1893. After his major league appearances, Stafford played in the minor leagues until 1898, including seasons in the New England League and the Western League. His older brother was James Joseph "General" Stafford, who played in the major leagues between 1890 and 1899.

Stafford became known as "Doc" after his playing career, when he became an optometrist in his hometown of Dudley, Massachusetts. He died in 1940, aged 70; both he and his brother are buried in Calvary Cemetery in Dudley.

References

External links
, or Retrosheet
 

1870 births
1940 deaths
Major League Baseball pitchers
Cleveland Spiders players
Baseball players from Massachusetts
19th-century baseball players
Worcester Grays players
Woonsocket (minor league baseball) players
Providence Grays (minor league) players
Lewiston (minor league baseball) players
Grand Rapids Gold Bugs players
Winsted Welcomes players
Paterson Silk Weavers players
New Bedford Whalers (baseball) players
Worcester (minor league baseball) players
People from Dudley, Massachusetts
Sportspeople from Worcester County, Massachusetts